Extreme Witchcraft is the fourteenth studio album by American indie rock band Eels, released through E Works/PIAS Recordings on January 28, 2022. It was preceded by the singles "Good Night on Earth", "Steam Engine", "The Magic", and "Amateur Hour". The album will be supported by the 2023 Lockdown Hurricane world tour.

Background
After a 1998 performance of "Last Stop: This Town" on the British music chart program Top of the Pops, Eels frontman Mark Oliver "E" Everett and PJ Harvey's John Parish met backstage. They discussed the possibility of a collaboration, leading to the two coming up with the 2001 album Souljacker, along with subsequent live performances, the latest being in 2019.

During the height of the COVID-19 pandemic lockdown in early 2021, Everett received a message from Mark Romanek, the director of the "Novocaine for the Soul" music video. Romanek revealed to Everett that he had been in an "intense" Souljacker phase, giving Everett an idea of contacting Parish to see if he would be up for some musical ideas.

Recording
During the beginning of the project, due to differing time zones, Everett worked at 4 am in his Los Feliz home, while Parish worked in his HonorSound studio in Bristol. Everett would occasionally email tracks to his bandmate Koool G Murder, asking for his input and if he wanted to contribute. Parish then flew to Los Angeles, working on most of the album in Everett's studio with Koool G Murder. Everett mentions that the album was constructed "very organically and quickly" and was finished in a matter of weeks.

Title
The title originates from a 2018 filing of a restraining order against Beyoncé by her former drummer Kimberly Thompson, who accused Beyoncé of casting "magic spells of sexual molestation", murdering her kitten, and practicing "extreme witchcraft, dark magic". Everett was amused by the story and joked about naming his next album "Extreme Witchcraft".

It was a potential title for the Earth to Dora album, but because of the differing dynamics of the title and the songs themselves, the name was scrapped. The title would come into play again while working with Parish, giving him buzz words like “give me some voodoo” or “give me something witchy”.

Critical reception

Extreme Witchcraft received generally positive reviews from critics. On Metacritic, the album has a weighted average score of 72 out of 100 based on 13 reviews, indicating "generally favorable reviews".

Joe Goggins of DIY awarded the album four out of five stars and wrote that it is "as freewheeling as Eels have sounded since Souljacker". Goggins elaborated that the album "casts E as the kind of louche rock frontman he's increasingly presented himself as on stage in recent years", concluding that it "is a record scored through, unmistakably, with a desire to have some fun".

Track listing

Personnel
Eels
E – guitar, vocals, production, recording (all except 5), mixing (all except 5)
Koool G Murder – bass guitar, recording, mixing (all except 5 and 11)
John Parish – guitar, production, recording, mixing (1, 2, 3, 6, 7, 8, 9)
P-Boo – drums, recording, mixing ("Learning While I Lose")

Production
Philip Beaudreau – design
Gus Black – photography
Ryan Bosch – recording, mixing ("Grandfather Clock Strikes Twelve")
Don Hersch – mastering at D2 Mastering

Charts

References

External links

2022 albums
Albums produced by John Parish
Albums produced by Mark Oliver Everett
Eels (band) albums
PIAS Recordings albums